No Road Back is a 1957 British crime film directed by Montgomery Tully.

The film is notable for being the first major film role for future filmstar Sean Connery. Connery's role is that of a minor gangster who has a speech impediment.

Cast
 Skip Homeier as John Railton
 Paul Carpenter as Clem Hayes
 Patricia Dainton as Beth
 Norman Wooland as Inspector Harris
 Margaret Rawlings as Mrs. Railton
 Eleanor Summerfield as Marguerite
 Alfie Bass as Rudge Harvey
 Sean Connery as Spike

See also

List of films featuring the deaf and hard of hearing

References

External links
 
 
 
 
 

1957 films
British crime drama films
1950s crime drama films
British black-and-white films
Films directed by Montgomery Tully
RKO Pictures films
1957 drama films
1950s English-language films
1950s British films